Queens Quay or Queen's Quay may refer to:

Queen's Quay, Belfast, a district in Belfast
Queens Quay (Toronto), a street in Toronto
Queens Quay station, an underground streetcar station in Toronto
Queen's Quay Terminal, a building in Toronto